SS Rex was an Italian ocean liner launched in 1931. She held the westbound Blue Riband between 1933 and 1935. Originally built for the Navigazione Generale Italiana (NGI) as SS Guglielmo Marconi, its state-ordered merger with the Lloyd Sabaudo line meant that the ship sailed for the newly created Italia Flotta Riunite (Italian Line).

Rex operated transatlantic crossings from Italy with its running mate,  prior to the outbreak of the Second World War. Rex maintained a commercial service in the Mediterranean Sea for eight years, but when Italy entered the war in June 1940 Rex was laid up for safe-keeping. On 8 September 1944, off Koper, Rex was hit by cannon fire and 123 rockets launched by Royal Air Force aircraft, caught fire from bow to stern. She rolled onto the port side, burned for four days, and sank in shallow water. The ship was broken up in situ in 1950.

History 

Following North German Lloyd's successful capture of the Blue Riband with its  and  duo of ocean liners, Rex was intended to be Italy's effort to do the same.

Both ships were dubbed "The Riviera afloat". To carry the theme even further, sand was scattered in the outdoor swimming pools, creating a beach-like effect highlighted by multicolored umbrellas. Rex was decorated in a classical style while the norm of the time was the Art Deco or the so-called "Liner Style" that had been premiered onboard the French Line's  in 1927, Rexs running mate Conte Di Savoia followed this rule, but also had rooms with classic style like her First Class Social Room also known as "Colonial Hall" . The ship's exterior design had followed the trend set by Germany's Bremen and Europa.

Rex was the first to be completed and was christened on 1 August 1931, in the presence of King Victor Emmanuel III and Queen Elena. She was both larger and faster than Conte di Savoia. Her attempt of a record-breaking maiden voyage was unsuccessful. She sailed from Genoa in September 1932, after a send-off from Premier Benito Mussolini, with a passenger list of international celebrities. While approaching Gibraltar, serious mechanical difficulties arose. Repairs took three days. Half her passengers requested to leave, preferring to reach Germany's coasts and take Europa; arriving in New York they found Rex already at dock. Lengthy repairs were required in New York before returning to Europe. She arrived in Genoa on 26 October 1932, making her first west-to-east crossing in six and a half days.

This record would last until 1935 when it was captured by the French Line's .

On 12 May 1938, in a demonstration of U.S. air power, three B-17 bombers of the U.S. Army Air Corps intercepted Rex  at sea in a highly publicized event.

World War II

Following the outbreak of war, both Rex and Conte di Savoia continued regular Mediterranean cruises as if totally unaffected by events to the north. In the end, Italian liners proved to be among the final ships trading on a commercial basis. Their voyages ceased in the spring of 1940 and they were returned to Italian ports for safekeeping, with Rex laid up at Genoa, but after the city was bombed, the Italian Line decided to move it to Trieste. To prevent German forces from using the liner to blockade the harbor entrance, Rex was moved near Pula, where she lay for some time.

On 6 September 1944, Rex was spotted under tow south of Trieste, by a Royal Air Force (RAF) pilot, and showed a slight list.

On 8 September 1944, she was attacked in the Bay of Capodistria (now Koper, Slovenia), south of Trieste by 12 Bristol Beaufighter aircraft of 272 Squadron RAF, escorted by nine North American P-51 Mustang aircraft assigned to the  52nd Fighter Group, USAAF. She was listing and on fire after being struck by 59 RP-3 rockets and numerous 20 mm cannon-shells. A second attack, later that day, by 12 more Beaufighters of 39 Squadron RAF and  16 Squadron, South African Air Force, resulted in her turning over and sinking in shallow water.

Post-war

In 1946, officials of the Italian steamship line proposed to salvage Rex and recommission it. However, the liner had been sunk in a portion of the harbor allocated to Yugoslavia, which blocked any recovery. The remains of Rex - about one-third of the ship, including double bottom, boilers, and engines - are located off the Slovenian coast in the Gulf of Koper. The rest was scavenged for scrap iron in the 1950s by the local government; it was said that the ship was the largest Slovenian "iron mine" at the time. Since 1954, after the formal annexation of Zone B of the Free Territory of Trieste to Yugoslavia, an anchor claimed to be from Rex has been on display in Congress Square of the Slovenian capital Ljubljana to symbolize the defeat of Fascist expansionism. Though claimed to be from the liner, this anchor is not of the dreadnought style that Rex had.

The victory of Rex heralded a peak in Italy's cultural emergence; a lasting source of inspiration and national pride. In 1963 Peroni Nastro Azzurro was named for the "Blue Ribbon" which Rex won (nastro azzurro means "blue ribbon" in Italian.)

In popular culture
The ship was featured in the 1973 film Amarcord, representing the "greatest thing the [Italian] regime ever built."

References

External links 
 Classic Liners of Long Ago
 The Myth and the Legend, a page dedicated to the ship Rex (sl,it,de)
 Rex, at "Great Ships"
 , illustrated description of Rex and Conte di Savoia

Ocean liners
Steamships
Blue Riband holders
Passenger ships of Italy
Merchant ships sunk by aircraft
Ships sunk by British aircraft
World War II shipwrecks in the Mediterranean Sea
1931 ships
Maritime incidents in September 1944
Ships built in Genoa
Ships built by Gio. Ansaldo & C.
World War II merchant ships of Italy
Shipwrecks in the Adriatic Sea